Adrian Ungur was the defending champion but lost in the quarterfinals to Tim Pütz.

Robin Haase won the title after defeating Lorenzo Giustino 7–6(7–2), 6–2 in the final.

Seeds

Draw

Finals

Top half

Bottom half

References
Main Draw
Qualifying Draw

Sibiu Open - Singles
Sibiu Open